The first Martin ministry was the eighth ministry of the Colony of New South Wales, and first occasion of being led by James Martin QC.

Martin was elected in the first free elections for the New South Wales Legislative Assembly held in 1856. He came to power as Premier after Charles Cowper's government fell in October 1863.

The title of Premier was widely used to refer to the Leader of Government, but not enshrined in formal use until 1920.

There was no party system in New South Wales politics until 1887. Under the constitution, ministers were required to resign to recontest their seats in a by-election when appointed. Such ministerial by-elections were usually uncontested and on this occasion, Peter Faucett (Yass Plains), William Forster (East Sydney) and Arthur Holroyd (Parramatta) were unopposed. Two other ministers Geoffrey Eagar (West Sydney) and Bowie Wilson (Goldfields South), were easily re-elected, with more than 90% of the vote. Charles Cowper Jr. resigned his seat of The Tumut to challenge Martin at the Orange by-election. While defeated, Martin promptly returned to parliament, winning the by-election for The Tumut, the seat vacated by Charles Cowper Jr.

This ministry covers the period from 16 October 1863 until 2 February 1865, when Cowper retained government by defeating Martin at the 1864–65 general election.

Composition of ministry

 
Ministers are members of the Legislative Assembly unless otherwise noted.

See also

Self-government in New South Wales
Members of the New South Wales Legislative Assembly, 1860–1864
Members of the New South Wales Legislative Assembly, 1864–1869
Second Martin ministry (1866–1868)
Third Martin ministry (1870–1872)

References

 

New South Wales ministries
1863 establishments in Australia
1865 disestablishments in Australia